Priority seats have been designated in public transport vehicles by certain transport operators to allow elderly, disabled, pregnant women and the injured to ride public transport with an equal degree of access and comfort as other people. Priority seats can be found on various public transportation, including the mass transit railways, buses, minibuses, and trams. The slogan "Please offer your seat to anyone in need" is often displayed beside the seat. The elderly, disabled, pregnant, and injured have priority to take these seats. In most cases, there is no regulation to restrict the use of priority seats, but people are expected to offer their seats to those in need.

Background
Under the principle of "Barrier Free Environment", the idea of "priority seats" was first introduced in northern Europe
. Providing unimpeded, effortless access and ideal living environment to all people is the final goal. Over the past centuries, the idea of priority seats spread to Asian countries such as Japan, Taiwan and Korea. These three are the most significant examples, owing to their cultural emphasis on politeness that teaches the younger generation to offer seats to the elderly. Failing to do so would be regarded as disrespectful. Countries such as Australia, Malaysia, Singapore and China have similar traditions. In addition, railways in some countries – for instance the Southern and Great Northern routes in England – allow qualifying passengers to apply for and obtain priority seat cards which they can show to fellow passengers to prove their eligibility.

Objectives
Priority seats motivate people to offer seats to people with special need. Taking the initiative to give seats to them can prevent them from accidents when travelling on public transports. According to the Press Release of The Kowloon Motor Bus in 2011, priority seats are designed to provide people with special need a safe and enjoyable journey. Such passengers, including the elderly and people with mobility obstacles, may face special inconvenience and difficulties during travelling. Introducing priority seats encourages individuals to bear the social responsibility of caring for others in need. According to the Press Release of The Kowloon Motor Bus in 2011, promotion of priority seats aims to enhance the awareness of offering seats to the people with special need so as to cultivate a culture of care. The motion encourages people to be sensitive about other people's needs and take actions of empathy and altruism.

In different localities

The "yield the seat culture" has been around for many years in various countries in the world, but different countries have great relations because of their nationality, education policy, and public order.

Australia 
Priority seats on public transport are an aspect of Australian culture. It is expected in Australian culture for students with state-sponsored transport passes, who usually attend schools outside of their local area, to give up their seats to paying passengers, who are usually working adults, local residents, etc. It is considered polite to give up seats to the elderly, though many young people do not expressly follow this custom. In Melbourne, passengers who do not concede their seats to standing passengers with special needs, when asked to do so, will be fined AUD $147.61.

Hong Kong
In Hong Kong, Priority seats were first introduced in the MTR in 2009 with the "Priority Seats Campaign". The Smiley World Characters, large red stickers with big smiley faces, were stuck on the top of the priority seats so as to attract people's attention.

After the setup of priority seats in MTR, bus companies started to follow. Priority seats were introduced to the Kowloon Motor Bus (KMB) in May 2011, and then followed by Citybus and New World First Bus (NWFB) in June 2012. In accordance with the press releases, the KMB first introduced priority seats to 87 of their buses. In each bus, several priority seats were located at the front of the lower deck. The headrests of such seats are in green with words of "PRIORITY SEAT" and symbols of elderly, disabled, pregnant women, and people with infants or young children to help passengers identify them. Advertisements were also broadcast in order to raise the awareness of passengers to offer seats. Receiving positive and supportive feedback after the 6-month trial, in the year 2012, the KMB decided to have priority seats set up in all of its buses and the headrests of such seats were changed into dark purple.
 
According to press releases from the government, for the minibus, priority seat is provided at the first single seat near the door. And for the tram, there are a few priority seats offered near the driver in the lower deck. Also, there is priority seating offered by the Cathay Pacific airline, for passengers with disabilities. But since other transportations such as taxi and ferry which usually do not allow standing, there are no specifically designated priority seats.

South Korea 
Korean culture strongly recommends reserving seats for the elderly. Even if the entire car is overcrowded, the elder seat will be empty. Seoul Metropolitan Government announced that it will apply new design for pregnant women at Seoul Subway lines 2 and 5. Seoul Metropolitan Government expects that the change could allow passengers to yield their seats to pregnant women more easily.

In order to help people recognize that the seat is for the pregnant women, the seat will change its color into pink from the back of the seat with a note that says 'This is the seat for a future protagonist' written on the bottom.

Taiwan 

In Taiwan, priority seats are installed on public transportation. Some banks, airports, or hospital elevators will also mark the icons that are given priority to the elderly and the weak women and children, and have signs to that effect. Taiwanese children are also taught to give up priority seats. A Yield the seat' culture is deeply rooted, and even become a reflex action.

The priority seat system in Taiwan originated in the Republic of China in the late 1940s or early 1950s. At that time, there were many consecutive accidents in which elderly people boarded a bus and accidentally fell. Therefore, the Taipei City Government began to plan to set up a priority seat on the bus. On major transportation vehicles, it is provided for those with mobility difficulties or needs.

In the 2010s, the media have reported on disputes and controversies about priority seats, leading everyone to choose to stand, as no one was willing to sit on the priority seat. With the popularization of smartphones and social platforms, "social justice warriors" have sometimes tried to dox the passengers sitting in priority seats, uncovering their identity.

United States 
In the state of New York the transit authority is legally required to post signs reminding people to get up for elderly, pregnant, and disabled passengers. It is customary for people to get up for elderly, pregnant, and disabled passengers throughout the United States.

Controversies and disputes

There are two major controversies regarding priority seats. First of all, people think that only people in need can sit on the priority seats. Even if the train is full, priority seats are still left empty. This situation is common in Taiwan and Hong Kong. People, especially young people, are not willing to sit on the train as they are afraid of being morally criticized, scolded or even cyberbullied (like uploading their scenes of occupying priority seats to social networking websites which is sometimes not the truth). However, the priority seats are first-come-first-served. Priority seats are designed to promote the culture of offering seats to the needy. If there are no needy on the public transport, people are free to sit on the priority seats.

Also, many passengers currently have little awareness of offering seats to people in need. They pretend not to notice other passengers in greater need for a seat. This situation is more common in China. People seated on priority seats refuse to move for people in greater need for a seat (the issue of cyberbullying mentioned in the previous paragraph is common due to such refusal). Some suggest mandating the offer of seats to people in need by law just like some cities in the United States, Canada and Australia. But according to press release published by HKSAR government, the government would like to promote such an act through the advocacy of a culture of courtesy rather than through legal means.

Other related information
Some disabilities are more unfamiliar and uneasily recognized. The Toronto Transit Commission reminds everyone of the possibility that people who refuse to offer their seat may have a hidden disability that is either not likely to be recognized or a disability that is uncomfortable to discuss in public.

Legislation
In some jurisdictions, priority seating is mandated by legislation. The Accessibility for Ontarians with Disabilities Act, 2005 in Ontario, Canada stipulates that all transport providers must provision "clearly marked courtesy seating for persons with disabilities [...] located as close as practicable to the entrance door of the vehicle".

References

External links
 

Rapid transit
Accessible transportation